Joseph Mwepu Ilunga (22 August 1949 – 8 May 2015) was a football defender from Zaire (now the Democratic Republic of the Congo). His name is also written as Alunga Mwepu.

Club career
Mwepu played club football for Englebert TP Mazembe in his native Zaire, with whom he won the 1967 African Cup of Champions and 1968 African Cup of Champions.

International career

Mwepu played for his country, then called Zaire, during the 1974 FIFA World Cup. Zaire were then the first sub-Saharan African team to qualify for the World Cup finals. During their group match against Brazil, he ran out of his team's defensive wall and kicked away a free kick before the ball was in play. He was subsequently cautioned, but some commentators felt that he seemed oblivious as to what he had done wrong. However, Mwepu claimed that he was quite aware of the rules – as would be expected from an experienced player in a successful side – and was hoping that the referee would send him off. The intended red card would have been a protest against his country's authorities, who were alleged to be depriving the players of their rightful earnings. The 1974 World Cup did not mark the end of Mwepu's international career, as he was included in Zaire's squad at the 1975 Iran International Tournament.

Death
Mwepu Ilunga died in May 2015 after a long illness in the Saint-Joseph de Limete Hospital, Kinshasa.

References

External links
 

1949 births
2015 deaths
Africa Cup of Nations-winning players
1974 FIFA World Cup players
1974 African Cup of Nations players
Democratic Republic of the Congo footballers
Democratic Republic of the Congo international footballers
TP Mazembe players
Place of birth missing
Association football defenders